Aggravation may refer to:

Events
 Aggravation (law) of a crime 
 Aggravation of a symptom

Titled works

Music
  Aggravation (1991 album), by Treponem Pal
 "Aggravation" (1966), single by Chris Curtis, an English musician 
 "Aggravation" (1973), song by Martha Veléz, an American singer 
 "Aggravation" (1989), song on UK Jive, by The Kinks

Other media
 Aggravation (1896), a painting by Briton Rivière, English artist 
 Aggravation (board game), with marbles as well

See also